The Mann School is located in Holambi Khurd, near Alipur on National Highway 1 (NH 1), New Delhi, India. Its inception was in 1989. The school is located 25 km from New Delhi Railway Station and 35 km from Indira Gandhi International Airport.

The Mann School is a member of Indian Public Schools' Conference (IPSC) and an ISO-9001:2000 and ISO 14001:2004 certified school and  British Council International school awardee.

Academics 
The teachers inhabit the campus, which ensures their accessibility even during late hours at the time of examinations. The school follows the CBSE syllabus for all its classes from I to XII.  The three streams (science[PCM/PCB/PCMB], commerce and humanities) are offered at MPS.  Laboratories for the subjects are provided. There is provision for professional coaching on campus for competitive examinations like IIT, PMT, and NDA.

Extra-curriculars 
Extra-curricular activities include adventure sports, music, Art, skating, gymnastics, field trips, Clubs & Hobbies as Cookery, Photography club, Animation & Gaming, Astronomy club, Classical dances, etc. The school also offers treks, yoga classes, swimming, Horse riding, Athletics, all major games and a number of student organizations like MUN, MOSS,ETC.

Life at MS 
The school has separate residential blocks for jr.boys, snr.boys and girls. Each child is assigned to a house master/warden.  Each residential block has its own study and recreation room.

See also
Education in India
Education in Delhi
List of schools in Delhi
 CBSE

References 
 Official website

External links

Schools in Delhi
Educational institutions established in 1989
Boarding schools in Delhi
1989 establishments in Delhi